Laldinpuia Pachuau (born 29 November 1996), popularly known as Dinpuia, is an Indian professional footballer who plays as a defender for Indian Super League club Jamshedpur.

Club career
Born in Mizoram, Laldinpuia began his career with Mizoram Premier League side Bethlehem Vengthlang before moving to Chhinga Veng. After the 2018–19 season, Laldinpuia was awarded the Best Defender award in the Mizoram Premier League. He also participated with the club during their 2nd Division campaign.

Following good performances in the Mizoram Premier League, Laldinpuia was called up to represent Mizoram in the Santosh Trophy in both 2018 and 2019.

Aizawl
On 9 September 2020, Laldinpuia joined I-League side Aizawl for the 2020–21 season. He made his debut for the club on 9 January 2021 in their season opening 0–1 defeat against Punjab. Laldinpuia then scored his first professional goal on 30 January 2021 against NEROCA. His 37th minute goal was the opener in a 2–1 victory.

Career statistics

Club

Honours
Individual
Mizoram Premier League Best Defender: 2018–19

References

External links
Profile at the All India Football Federation website

1996 births
Living people
People from Mizoram
Indian footballers
Association football defenders
Chhinga Veng FC players
Aizawl FC players
Mizoram Premier League players
I-League 2nd Division players
I-League players
Mizoram footballers
Footballers from Mizoram
Jamshedpur FC players